Third or 3rd may refer to:

Numbers 
 3rd, the ordinal form of the cardinal number 3
 , a fraction of one third
 1⁄60 of a second, or 1⁄3600 of a minute

Places
 3rd Street (disambiguation)
 Third Avenue (disambiguation)
 Highway 3

Music

Music theory
Interval number of three in a musical interval
major third, a third spanning four semitones
minor third, a third encompassing three half steps, or semitones
neutral third, wider than a minor third but narrower than a major third
augmented third, an interval of five semitones
diminished third, produced by narrowing a minor third by a chromatic semitone
Third (chord), chord member a third above the root
Degree (music), three away from tonic
mediant, third degree of the diatonic scale
submediant, sixth degree of the diatonic scale – three steps below the tonic
chromatic mediant, chromatic relationship by thirds
Ladder of thirds, similar to the circle of fifths

Albums
Third/Sister Lovers, a 1974 album by Big Star first released in 1978
Third (Soft Machine album), 1970
Third (Portishead album), 2008
Third (Cait Brennan album), a 2017 album by Cait Brennan
3rd (The Rasmus EP), 1996
3rd (The Baseball Project album), released by The Baseball Project in 2014
Thirds (album), a 1971 album by the James Gang

Other uses
Third (play), a 2005 work by Wendy Wasserstein
Third (curling), a curling position
Thirds, third-born children in the 1985 novel Ender's Game
Thirds, a 2007 play by Jacob M. Appel
Third World, economically underdeveloped nations
Third-class degree, a type of British undergraduate degree classification
Third (angle), in astronomy and cartography, fraction of a degree
Richard Third (1927–2016), Anglican bishop in the Church of England
Third Beach, located at Ferguson Point in Stanley Park in Vancouver, British Columbia
Third Brook, flows into West Brook by Walton, New York
Third Name, Odin, All Father

See also
1/3 (disambiguation)
Salvador Rodil III
3 (disambiguation)
III (disambiguation)
Number Three (disambiguation)
The Third (disambiguation)
Third party (disambiguation)
Third person (disambiguation)
The Third Album (disambiguation)
Triad (disambiguation)
Third Fleet (disambiguation)

br:Trede
es:Tercero
ja:サード
pl:Tercja